Your Face or Mine? is a British comedy game show that originally aired on E4 from September 2002 to May 2003, hosted by Jimmy Carr and June Sarpong. Comedy Central revived the show in 2017 with Carr and Katherine Ryan as co-hosts. The revived series ran for 66 episodes from May 2017 to December 2019.

Format

Round 1
Two contestants, usually a couple, have to choose who they think are the most attractive when presented with photos of two random individuals (the people in these pictures are also usually in the audience). If their choice matches with that of the audience, they win money.

Round 2
The contestants then have to choose who is the most attractive out of two celebrities, again winning cash if their opinion matches that of the audience.

Round 3
A special guest (of which there are four usually consisting of a stranger, friends, workmates, and sometimes a celebrity) joins the contestants and they have to decide who is more attractive between the special guest and one of the contestants. If their choice matches with that of the audience, they win money.

Round 4
Lastly, the two contestants have to decide who is the most attractive out of each other, winning if they guessed the same as the audience.

Episodes

E4

Comedy Central

References

External links

2002 British television series debuts
2019 British television series endings
2010s British television series
2000s British game shows
2010s British game shows
Channel 4 game shows
Comedy Central (British TV channel) original programming
E4 comedy
English-language television shows
Television series by Fremantle (company)
British television series revived after cancellation